This is a list of theatrical feature films released under the Touchstone Pictures banner (known as that since 1986, with Tough Guys) and films released before that under the former name, Touchstone Films (1983–1986).

Most films listed here were distributed in the United States, unless otherwise noted, by Walt Disney Studios' theatrical distribution unit; currently known as Walt Disney Studios Motion Pictures, formerly known as Buena Vista Distribution Company/Buena Vista Film Distribution Company (until 1987) and Buena Vista Pictures Distribution (1987–2007).

1980s

1990s

2000s 
{| class="wikitable sortable" width=100%
|-
! width=20% | Title
! width=15% | US Release
! width=50% | Co-production with
|-
| Play It to the Bone
| January 14, 2000
|
|-
| The Next Best Thing
| March 3, 2000
|Paramount Pictures, Lakeshore Entertainment
|-
| Mission to Mars
| March 10, 2000 
| Spyglass Entertainment
|-
| High Fidelity
| March 31, 2000 
|Working Title Films
|-
|Keeping the Faith
| April 14, 2000
|rowspan=2|Spyglass Entertainment
|-
|Shanghai Noon
| May 26, 2000
|-
| Gone in 60 Seconds
| June 9, 2000 
|rowspan=2| Jerry Bruckheimer Films
|-
| Coyote Ugly
| August 4, 2000
|-
| The Crew
| August 25, 2000
|
|-
| Unbreakable
| November 22, 2000 
|Barry Mendel Productions
|-
| O Brother, Where Art Thou?
| December 22, 2000 
|Universal Pictures, StudioCanal and Working Title Films, also North American distribution 
|-
| Double Take
| January 12, 2001 
|
|-
| Pearl Harbor
| May 25, 2001 
|Jerry Bruckheimer Films
|-
| Crazy/Beautiful
| June 29, 2001 
|
|-
| Bubble Boy
| August 24, 2001 
|
|-
|-
| New Port South| September 7, 2001
|
|-
|-
| Corky Romano| October 12, 2001 
|
|-
|-
|-
|-
| Out Cold| November 21, 2001 
|Spyglass Entertainment and The Donners' Company
|-
| The Royal Tenenbaums| December 14, 2001
|American Empirical Pictures
|-
| The Count of Monte Cristo| January 25, 2002
|Spyglass Entertainment
|-
| Sorority Boys| March 22, 2002 
|MBST Entertainment
|-
| Big Trouble| April 5, 2002 
|Sonnenfeld/Josephson Worldwide Entertainment
|-
| Frank McKlusky, C.I.| April 26, 2002
|Robert Simonds Productions
|-
| Ultimate X: The Movie| May 6, 2002 
|ESPN Films
|-
| Bad Company| June 7, 2002 
|Jerry Bruckheimer Films
|-
| Reign of Fire| July 12, 2002 
|Spyglass Entertainment
|-
| Signs| August 2, 2002
|Blinding Edge Pictures and The Kennedy/Marshall Company
|-
| Sweet Home Alabama| September 27, 2002 
|
|-
| Moonlight Mile| October 4, 2002
|Hyde Park Entertainment
|-
|-
| The Hot Chick| December 13, 2002 
|Happy Madison Productions
|-
| Gangs of New York| December 20, 2002 
|Miramax Films
|-
| 25th Hour| January 10, 2003 
|40 Acres and a Mule Filmworks 
|-
| The Recruit| January 31, 2003 
|rowspan=2|Spyglass Entertainment
|-
| Shanghai Knights| February 7, 2003 
|-
| Bringing Down the House| March 7, 2003 
|Hyde Park Entertainment
|-
|-
|-
|-
|-
|-
|-
| Open Range| August 14, 2003 
|Cobalt Media Group
|-
| Calendar Girls| September 2, 2003 
|
|-
| Hope Springs| September 5, 2003 
|
|-
| Cold Creek Manor| September 19, 2003 
|
|-
| Under the Tuscan Sun| September 26, 2003 
|
|-
| Veronica Guerin  
| October 2, 2003 
|Jerry Bruckheimer Films
|-
| Hidalgo| March 5, 2004 
|Casey Sliver Productions
|-
| The Ladykillers| March 26, 2004 
|Remake of 1955 film; Mike Zoss Productions
|-
| The Alamo| April 9, 2004 
|Remake of 1960 film; Imagine Entertainment
|-
| Raising Helen| May 28, 2004 
|Beacon Communications
|-
| King Arthur| July 7, 2004 
|Jerry Bruckheimer Films
|-
| The Village| July 30, 2004 
|Scott Rudin Productions
|-
| Mr. 3000| September 17, 2004 
|Dimension Films, Spyglass Entertainment and The Kennedy/Marshall Company
|-
| The Last Shot| September 24, 2004 
|MBST Entertainment and Mandeville Films
|-
| Ladder 49| October 1, 2004 
|Beacon Communications
|-
| The Life Aquatic with Steve Zissou| December 25, 2004 
|American Empirical Pictures and Scott Rudin Productions
|-
| A Lot like Love| April 22, 2005 
|Beacon Communications
|-
| The Hitchhiker's Guide to the Galaxy| April 29, 2005 
|Spyglass Entertainment
|-
| Dark Water| July 8, 2005
|
|-
| Flightplan| September 23, 2005 
|Imagine Entertainment
|-
| Goal!| September 29, 2005
| Milkshake Films and Epsilon Motion Pictures 
|-
| Shopgirl| October 21, 2005 
|20th Century Fox and Hyde Park Entertainment; North America distribution only
|-
| Casanova| December 25, 2005 
|
|-
| Annapolis| January 27, 2006 
|
|-
| Stick It| April 28, 2006 
|Spyglass Entertainment
|-
| Step Up| August 19, 2006 
|Summit Entertainment
|-
| The Guardian| September 26, 2006 
|Beacon Communications
|- 
| The Prestige| October 20, 2006
|Warner Bros. Pictures, Newmarket Films and Syncopy, North American distributor.
|-
| Deja Vu| November 22, 2006 
|Jerry Bruckheimer Films
|-
| Apocalypto| December 8, 2006 
|Icon Productions
|-
| Wild Hogs| March 2, 2007 
|Tollin/Robbins Productions
|-
| Dan in Real Life| October 26, 2007 
|Focus Features, also USA distribution 
|-
| Step Up 2: The Streets| February 14, 2008 
|Summit Entertainment
|-
| Swing Vote| August 1, 2008 
|Tree House Films
|-
| Miracle at St. Anna| September 26, 2008 
|40 Acres and a Mule Filmworks and Rai Cinema
|-
| Confessions of a Shopaholic| February 13, 2009 
|Jerry Bruckheimer Films
|-
| The Proposal| June 19, 2009 
| Mandeville Films
|-
| Surrogates| September 25, 2009
| Brownstone Productions and Mandeville Films
|}

 2010s 

 Notes 

 See also 

 Hollywood Pictures
 List of Walt Disney Studios films
 List of Walt Disney Pictures films
 List of 20th Century Studios films
 List of DreamWorks Pictures films

 Further reading 
 Maltin, Leonard. The Disney Films. New York: Disney Editions, 2000. .
 Smith, Dave. Disney A to Z: The Official Encyclopedia (Third Edition).'' New York: Disney Editions, 2006. .
 List of all films released by Disney regardless of label

References

External links 
 Official Website (Archive)

 
Touchstone Pictures
Touchstone Pictures
Touchstone
Touchstone Pictures